The Zawia Oil Refining Company (ARC) is a subsidiary of the National Oil Corporation (NOC), incorporated under Libyan Commercial Law since 1976. ARC operates the Zawia Refinery, which was built in 1974 by Snamprogetti, Italy. Zawia is currently the country's second largest oil refinery after the Ra's Lanuf Refinery. Primary products include naphtha, gasoline, kerosene, light vacuum gas oil (VGO), fuel oil, base lubricating oils, and asphalt.

Overview

Two naphtha hydrotreaters remove and decrease sulfur compounds, nitrogen compounds and other heavy metallic compounds and prepare feedstock for catalytic reformers. Each unit is also accompanied with a splitter to separate light and heavy naphtha. The two platforming units utilizes heavy naphtha as feedstock produces reformate, which is used as blending stock for gasoline production. The Platforming unit also produces LPG as a bye-product. Two kerosene hydrotreaters are utilized to produce desulfurised kerosene or Jet A-1. NOC is expected to re-tender an engineering, procurement and construction contract for upgrading the Zawia refinery.

Zawia Oil Terminal
The Zawia oil terminal is operated by ARC. The terminal is located in northwestern Libya at 
 constituting the harbour facility of the refinery. It has a single point mooring buoy, 27 m deep to accommodate vessels up to 100,000 tons capacity, 30 m deep to accommodate vessels up to 140,000 tons, and 23 m deep to accommodate 5,000 to 20,000 tons products for loading and unloading. The terminal comprises three offshore berths, located northeast of the refinery. On average, more than 200 oil tankers call at the terminal annually. In 2000, 195 tankers called at the terminal, 213 in 2001 and 215 in 2002 respectively.

Notes

References

Energy Information Administration (2007) Libya: Country Analysis Brief
World Bank (2006), Libyan Arab Jamahiriya: Economic Report, Social & Economic Development Group: MENA Region
P. Mobbs (2002) Mineral Industry of Libya
P. Mobbs (2000) Mineral Industry of Libya
Thomas S. Ahlbrandt (2001) The Sirte Basin Province of Libya: Sirte-Zelten Total Petroleum System U.S. Geological Survey
REMPEC 2004 Assessment of the existing situation and needs of the GSP Libyan Arab Jamahiriya regarding port reception facilities for collecting ship-generated garbage, bigle water and oily wastes in the ports of Tripoli, Misurata, Khoms and Zawia Terminal

External links

Official website (English)
GPCO Website
 اللجنة الشعبية العامة للمالية
Libya: Country Profile

Oil and gas companies of Libya
Tripolitania
Energy companies established in 1976
1976 establishments in Libya